Darcey & Stacey is an American reality television show that premiered on TLC on August 16, 2020. The show stars 90 Day Fiancé: Before the 90 Days cast members and twins Darcey Silva and Stacey Silva. The series documents their family life, professional endeavors, love and relationships in Middletown, Connecticut. The show airs on TLC on Sundays at 10:00 pm. Darcey & Stacey: Inside the Episode showed behind-the-scenes footage about each episode and it aired on TLC on Mondays.

On October 27, 2020, TV Fanatic reported that the series was renewed for a second season after a "record-breaking freshman run". The second season premiered on July 19, 2021, and its after-show Darcey & Stacey: Pillow Talk premiered on July 23, 2021. The third season premiered on January 10, 2022. The fourth season of Darcey & Stacey premiered on January 23, 2023.

Overview 
On June 29, 2020, Entertainment Weekly announced that Darcey Silva and her twin sister Stacey are getting their own reality show called Darcey & Stacey. The sisters and their family appeared in an exclusive interview and photo shoot for Entertainment Weekly, when they announced their new show. TLC released a 2-minute trailer of the show on July 21, 2020.

Darcey Silva, alongside sister Stacey, appeared on 90 Day Fiancé: Before the 90 Days for four seasons between 2017 and 2020. 90 Day Fiancé: Before the 90 Days documented Darcey's relationships with Jesse and later with Tom, but both relationships ended. Darcey and Stacey live in the same house with their children and the sisters got divorced from their former husbands on the same day.

Premise 
The series follows the lives of identical twins Darcey and Stacey Silva in Middletown, Connecticut.  Stacey has two teenage sons and Darcey has two teenage daughters, Aniko and Aspen, who can be seen on the series. It regularly featured members of their family such as Darcey and Stacey's divorced parents, Mike and Nancy. The series focuses on Stacey's five-year relationship with her Albanian fiancé, Florian Sukaj and Darcey's new Bulgarian boyfriend, Georgi Rusev. Florian's K-1 visa was approved and he meets Stacey in New York City. Florian faces cheating accusations, when he is caught posing in pictures with another woman. Darcey and her new boyfriend Georgi began talking online and the two later met in Miami. Darcey explains on camera that Georgi is a masseur from Bulgaria, but he lives in Arlington, Virginia. Darcey and Georgi have an argument and she asks if Georgi has a secret child.

In the show's second season, Darcey is having issues with Georgi after learning that he was on "sugar mama websites" and he hid money on a sock. Darcey is also left hurt after Georgi reached out to her ex-boyfriend Jesse. Stacey and Florian discuss having children in the future and during a doctor's appointment Stacey finds out that she has a cyst on her ovary. In the season finale, the twins travel to Turkey to undergo plastic surgery and Darcey breaks up with Georgi. In a preview for the third season, Darcey's daughter Aniko, can be seen competing in a pageant while the twins are busy promoting their fashion line. During the show's third season, Darcey and Georgi attend couple's counseling and later announce plans to have a dual wedding with Stacey and Florian in Miami.

On November 4, 2022, People magazine released exclusive wedding photos of Stacey and Florian's second wedding at Saybrook Point Resort & Marina in Connecticut. People magazine also announced that Darcey & Stacey's fourth season premieres January 23, 2023. Stacey and Florian's wedding planning and the ceremony is featured in the new season.

Reception 
Darcey & Stacey has been a ratings success for TLC – the season premiere debuted with 2.1 million total viewers, while the second episode "Arrivals and Departures" was seen by 1.9 million total viewers. The second episode was the fifth most watched original cable telecast program on Sunday night, beating several shows such as Bravo's The Real Housewives of Potomac. The third episode "Meltdown in Middletown" attracted 2.02 million viewers and was the night's second most watched show on TLC. The show's first season ended its 10-week run on October 18, 2020, and it averaged a 2.11 rating with W25-54 and a 1.43 rating with P25-54. The series made TLC the number one cable network on Sunday nights, and averaged 2.5M P2+ viewers per episode.

Polish News called the sisters "fan-favorite stars", and Us Weekly commented that "90 Day Fiancé fans have always been crazy about Darcey Silva's journey to finding The One." Ahead of the show's third season, E! Online wrote: "The Silva family legacy is certainly at the heart of Darcey & Stacey, including looking to the next generation. Darcey's daughters, Aniko and Aspen, are set to reappear this season, with a focus on Aniko competing in the Miss Connecticut Teen USA competition." In 2020, News24 gave the show three out of five stars, commenting: "The twins are unapologetic about their quirks, often play up what's been said about them and have garnered a dedicated fan base - which includes superfans Chrissy Teigen and John Legend. And, they've got a fan in me too."

Cast

Main cast 

 Darcey Silva, television personality and co-owner of fashion line House of Eleven with Stacey. Darcey was engaged to masseuse Georgi and has two daughters from a previous marriage.
 Stacey Silva,  television personality and co-owner of fashion line House of Eleven with Darcey. Stacey is married to model Florian Sukaj and has two sons from a previous marriage.

Supporting cast 
 Mike Silva, Darcey and Stacey's father
 Nancy Silva, Darcey and Stacey's mother, who is divorced from Mike
 Aniko Bollok, Darcey's daughter
 Aspen Bollok, Darcey's daughter
 Florian Sukaj, Stacey's fiancé of five years, who has been approved for a K-1 visa
 Georgi Rusev, Darcey's new Bulgarian boyfriend and fiancé. Georgi is a 32-year old fitness model and masseuse.

Episodes

Series overview

Season 1 (2020)

Season 2 (2021)

Season 3 (2022)

Season 4 (2023)

Specials

Darcey & Stacey: Inside the Episode

International broadcasts

References

External links

House of Eleven

2020 American television series debuts
2020s American reality television series
Television shows set in Connecticut
Middletown, Connecticut